Zakhar Bron (born 17 December 1947, in Oral, Kazakhstan) is a Russian violinist and violin pedagogue of Jewish, Polish and Romanian descent.

His students have included Vadim Repin, Gwendolyn Masin, Daniel Hope, Maxim Vengerov, Vadim Gluzman, Priya Mitchell, Igor Malinovsky, Alexandre Da Costa, Denis Goldfeld, Daishin Kashimoto, Tamaki Kawakubo, Mayuko Kamio, Mayu Kishima, Soyoung Yoon, Christoph Seybold, Sayaka Shoji, Nikolai Madoyev and David Garrett.

Bron studied with Boris Goldstein. Before he was well-known, he taught privately in Novosibirsk. Since then, he has taught at the Royal Academy of Music in London, the Conservatory of Rotterdam, the Musikhochschule Lübeck and the Reina Sofía School of Music in Madrid. In 1997, he took up a position at the Cologne Musikhochschule.

Bibliography 
 The Way They Play. (by Samuel Applebaum and Mark Zilberquit) Book 14. Paganinia Publication Inc., 1986, pp. 65–114

References

External links 
 
 Zakhar Bron School of Music
 Zakhar Bron Chamber Orchestra
 Magister Musicae; Master Class Videos by Professor Zakhar Bron 

1947 births
Academics of the Royal Academy of Music
German people of Kazakhstani descent
German people of Russian-Jewish descent
Henryk Wieniawski Violin Competition prize-winners
Kazakhstani Jews
Living people
People's Artists of Russia
People from Oral, Kazakhstan
Academic staff of the Reina Sofía School of Music
Russian classical violinists
Male classical violinists
Russian Jews
Russian music educators
Jewish violinists
Jewish musicians
Academic staff of the Zurich University of the Arts
Jewish classical violinists
21st-century classical violinists
21st-century Russian male musicians
Academic staff of the Lübeck Academy of Music
Russian people of Romanian descent
Academic staff of Novosibirsk Conservatory